The San Jose Open was a golf tournament on the Nike Tour. It ran from 1995 to 1998. It was played at Almaden Country Club in San Jose, California.

In 1998 the winner earned $40,500.

Winners

Notes

References

Former Korn Ferry Tour events
Golf in California
Sports in San Jose, California
Recurring sporting events established in 1995
Recurring sporting events disestablished in 1998